The British Rail Class 01 diesel locomotive is a short wheelbase 0-4-0 diesel-mechanical design intended for use in areas with tight curves and limited clearance.

History
Four examples were built by Andrew Barclay Sons & Co. of Kilmarnock (Scotland) in 1956. They were numbered 11503-11506, then D2953-2956, and two survived long enough to become 01001 (D2954) and 01002 (D2955) on the TOPS system. Their original depot allocation was to Stratford (30A). A fifth locomotive with detail differences was built in 1958 for departmental use at Peterborough Permanent Way Depot. It was originally No. 81 but was renumbered D2956 in July 1967 after the original D2956 had been withdrawn. 

For a fleet of just five locomotives, they were also very reliable, although Stratford Docks, where they originally worked, was not noted for creating very hard labour. Two examples, D2953 and D2956 were sold in 1966 and a third locomotive (the second D2956) followed in 1968.

D2954 and D2955 survived in BR service because they were required to service the Holyhead Breakwater, being the only locomotives light enough for that track, the pair were used by William Wild & Sons Ltd. They were renumbered 01001 and 01002 under TOPS. 01001 was not used after 1973 but was cannibalised for spare parts to keep its sister loco in service. 01001 was withdrawn in 1979, and 01002 followed in 1981. 01002 had last run when the Breakwater Railway closed in July 1980. Both locomotives were cut up on site still carrying their original livery of British Railways black with black-and-yellow "wasp stripe" warning ends and the original British Railways "unicycling lion" emblem; they were the last locomotives in BR service to do so.

Fleet list

Technical details
Class 01 locomotives had a Gardner 6-cylinder in-line, 4-stroke 6L3 engine of 153 hp (114 kW) at 1,200 rpm connected to a Wilson SE4, 4-speed epicyclic gear box with a Vulcan-Sinclair type 23 rigid hydraulic coupling, and a Wiseman 15LGB reverse and final drive unit. The wheels were connected by coupling rods and driven by a jackshaft.

Preservation
Two pre-TOPS members survive in preservation:
 D2953 by Heritage Shunters Trust at Rowsley South, Peak Rail
 the first D2956 on the East Lancashire Railway

Re-use of the '01' TOPS code

More recently, the sub-classification 01/5 has come into use to refer to small, privately owned shunters certified to run on the national network. As such, 01/5 is a collective grouping of a number of very different locomotives, having in common only that they are small, hitherto unclassified shunters of designs never given a BR classification.

References

Further reading

External links

 More images of 01002 shunting on the breakwater
 
 Page of photos of 01 002 on Holyhead Breakwater on the Breakwater's official page

01
Andrew Barclay locomotives
B locomotives
Railway locomotives introduced in 1956
Standard gauge locomotives of Great Britain